William Babcock may refer to:

 William Babcock (politician) (1785–1838), U.S. Representative from New York
 William Perkins Babcock (1826–1899), American painter
 William Henry Babcock (1849–1922), American author and poet
 William J. Babcock (1841–1897), American soldier and Medal of Honor recipient